Faith is the first studio album by the gothic metal band Eyes of Eden. It was released on 20 August 2007 in Europe and on 6 November 2007 in North America.

Track list 
 "Winter Night" – 3:37
 "When Gods Fall" – 3:37
 "Star" – 3:47
 "Pictures" – 4:10
 "Dancing Fire" – 3:15
 "Sleeping Minds" – 4:00
 "Daylight" – 4:03
 "Man in the Flame" – 4:22
 "From Heaven Sent" – 4:17
 "Not Human Kind" – 10:02

References 

2007 debut albums
Century Media Records albums
Eyes of Eden albums
Albums produced by Waldemar Sorychta